Agagus agagus is a species of sea snail, a marine gastropod mollusk in the family Trochidae, the top snails.

Description
The shell grows to a length of 9 mm, its diameter 10 mm. The umbilicate shell has a depressed conical shape with a swollen base. Its color is a vivid white with green spots. It contains 6½ sharp declining whorls with longitudinal oblique striae and spiral ribs. The aperture is subquadrangular. The outer lip is sharp.

Distribution
This species occurs in the Red Sea and in the Indian Ocean off Tanzania and South Africa.

References

 Kilburn, R. N. 1972. Taxonomic notes on South African marine Mollusca (2), with the description of new species and subspecies of Conus, Nassarius, Vexillum and Demoulia. Annals of the Natal Museum 21(2):391-437, 15 figs
 Kilburn, R.N. & Rippey, E. (1982) Sea Shells of Southern Africa. Macmillan South Africa, Johannesburg, xi + 249 pp. page(s): 41
 Herbert D.G. (1991). A revision of the genus Agagaus Jousseaume, 1894 (Mollusca: Gastropoda: Trochidae). Journal of Natural History 25:883-900.
 Richmond, M. (Ed.) (1997). A guide to the seashores of Eastern Africa and the Western Indian Ocean islands. Sida/Department for Research Cooperation, SAREC: Stockholm, Sweden. . 448 pp.

External links

 

Trochidae
Fauna of the Red Sea
Gastropods described in 1894
Taxa named by Félix Pierre Jousseaume